Start with a Strong and Persistent Desire is the debut album by English alternative rock band Vex Red. It was released on 4 March 2002 through I Am records. The album charted at number 48 on the UK Albums Chart and also spent two weeks on the chart. Two singles were released from the album. "Itch" was released in 2001, followed by "Can't Smile" in 2002 which reached number 45 in the UK Singles Chart.

The album was produced by nu metal producer Ross Robinson, who also signed the band to his Virgin Records imprint "I Am" in the early 2000s

Critical reception

Critical reception to the album was positive upon release. Drowned in Sound scored the album highly, reviewer Sajini Wijetilleka had particular praise for "Can't Smile", speaking of the track; "Sequenced-synth loops, emotional vocals and energised guitar swirls give us the excellent ‘Can’t Smile’, the best record that Gavin Rossdale wanted to, but could never ever make.". NME reviewer April Long gave the album positive write up stating; "The title says it all. Underpinning every spastic roar and raging riff on 
Vex Red‘s debut is the burning desire to make something enormous, resonant and real.". The Guardian gave the album 3/5 stars summarizing about the bands potential; " Vex Red take it a step further and become their own men. They might just evolve into greatness.".

Track listing

Personnel

Vex Red
 Terry Abbot – lead vocals, guitar
 Ash Soan – drums, percussion
 Ant Forbes – guitar, keyboards
 Nick Goulding – bass guitar, guitar
 Keith Lambert - bass guitar, programming

Production personnel
 Ross Robinson – Producer

Charts

Release history

References

2002 debut albums
Virgin Records albums